Karl Fritiof Malmström (27 December 1875 – 6 September 1938) was a Swedish diver. He competed at the 1908 Summer Olympics in the 3 m springboard and 10 m platform and won the silver medal in the platform.

References

1875 births
1938 deaths
Swedish male divers
Divers at the 1908 Summer Olympics
Olympic divers of Sweden
Olympic silver medalists for Sweden
Olympic medalists in diving
Medalists at the 1908 Summer Olympics
Divers from Gothenburg
19th-century Swedish people
20th-century Swedish people